Markus Feusi (born 24 August 1968) is a Swiss rower. He competed in the men's lightweight coxless four event at the 1996 Summer Olympics.

References

External links
 

1968 births
Living people
Swiss male rowers
Olympic rowers of Switzerland
Rowers at the 1996 Summer Olympics
Sportspeople from the canton of Schwyz